is located in Makinohara, Shizuoka Prefecture, Japan.

Crude oil was discovered at Sagara Village in May 1873, and hand-pumping operations began almost immediately. From 1874, Nippon Oil (the predecessor to modern ENEOS) began mechanical pumping operations. The Sagara field was the only producing oil field on Japan's Pacific coast, and was the first in Japan to use oil pumps. At the height of its production (in 1884), some 600 people were employed, and the field was producing 43,000 barrels of oil (721 kiloliters) per year. The oil was very light, and could be used in automobiles without refining.

Production stopped in 1955, with the advent of cheap, imported oil. On November 28, 1980, the oil field was proclaimed a natural monument and protected cultural property by the Shizuoka Prefectural government, and was transformed into a public park.

In popular culture 

The Sagara Oil Field was mentioned in the Japanese manga series "Dr. Stone", as a place to produce crude oil after the collapse of civilization and global trade.

References
 Island Arc, Origins of hydrocarbons in the Sagara oil field, central Japan. Volume 15 Issue 3, Pages 285 - 291.

Oil fields in Japan
Parks and gardens in Shizuoka Prefecture
Makinohara, Shizuoka